In aviation, an outside check or walk around is the air crew inspecting certain elements of an aircraft prior to boarding for security, safety, and operational reasons.

The pilot primarily inspects outside parts of the aircraft they will steer, e.g. control surfaces, tires and possible leaks from fuel or oil.

See also
 Preflight Planning Dispatch Checklist

Aviation safety